Hasluck can refer to:

People
 Alexandra Hasluck (1908–1993), author and social historian in Western Australia
 Frederick William Hasluck (1878-1920), English archaeologist
 Margaret Masson Hardie Hasluck (1885-1948), English archaeologist
 Paul Hasluck (1905-1993), Governor-General of Australia

Places
 Division of Hasluck, an Australian electoral division

See also
Oslac (disambiguation)